Peter Rock (born 1967) is an American novelist born and raised in Salt Lake City, Utah. His fiction often focuses on characters on the fringe of society — outsiders, wanderers — and allows his readers to see into the minds of these otherwise invisible characters.

Rock is a professor of creative writing at Reed College and lives in Portland, Oregon, with his wife and daughters.

Biography 
Rock attended Deep Springs College and received a BA in English from Yale University in 1991. He was a Wallace Stegner Fellow at the Stanford Writing Program from 1995 to 1997. The manuscript for his novel This Is the Place won the Henfield Award in 1996.

In 2010, Rock's novel My Abandonment, based on a true story, received an Alex Award by the American Library Association. It also won the Utah Book Award and was made into Debra Granik's 2018 film Leave No Trace, starring Ben Foster and Thomasin McKenzie. Leave No Trace received universal critical acclaim, with praise for the performances of Foster and McKenzie, and it is the most reviewed film to hold an approval rating of 100% on Rotten Tomatoes. (Rock was given a USC Scripter Award in 2010 for his role in the creation of the screenplay.)

His short stories have appeared in Tin House, Zoetrope: All-Story,  One Story, and other literary magazines.  Many of these stories are compiled in The Unsettling (2006). His fiction and non-fiction have also appeared in the New York Times T Magazine. His most recent novel, Passerthrough, was published in 2022.

He received a National Endowment for the Arts Fellowship in 1998 and a Guggenheim Fellowship in 2014.

Before joining Reed in 2001, he taught fiction at the University of Pennsylvania, at San Francisco State University, and at Yale.

Books 
 Passersthrough (Penguin Random House, 2022) 
 The Night Swimmers (Soho Press, 2019) 
 Spells: A Novel Within Photographs (Counterpoint, April 2017) 
 Klickitat (Harry N. Abrams, April 2016) 
 The Shelter Cycle (Houghton Mifflin Harcourt, April 2013) 
 My Abandonment (Mariner Books, March 2009) 
 The Unsettling (MP Publishing, 2006) 
 The Bewildered (MacAdam/Cage, 2005)
 The Ambidextrist (Context Books, 2004) 
 Carnival Wolves (Knopf Doubleday Publishing Group, 1998) 
 This is the Place (Knopf Doubleday Publishing Group, 1997)

References

External links 
 The Peter Rock Project - website dedicated to his work
 
 Interview by Rachel Mercer for Bomblog regarding The Shelter Cycle
 Lyric essay about traveling to the location of Watership Down

1967 births
20th-century American male writers
20th-century American novelists
21st-century American male writers
21st-century American novelists
American male novelists
Deep Springs College alumni
Living people
Novelists from Utah
Stegner Fellows
Yale University alumni